Love and Kisses was a black-and-white British sitcom that aired on ITV in 1955. It was written by Glenn Melvyn, who also starred in it. It was made for the ITV network by Associated-Rediffusion and was a spin-off series from the film The Love Match (1955) which was also written by and starred Glenn Melvyn.

Cast
Arthur Askey - Bill Brown
Lally Bowers - Sal Brown
Anthea Askey - Rose Brown
Ian Gardiner - Percy Brown
Glenn Melvyn - Wally Binns
Barbara Miller - Emma Binns
Danny Ross - Alf Hall
Bernard Graham - Terence Steel
Leonard Williams - Mr Seymour
Margaret Anderson - Pam

Plot
Bill Brown is a former engine driver who is now a landlord. His wife is Sal and he has two children, Rose and Percy. His regulars are Alf Hall, a milkman, and Wally Binns, who has a stammer.

Askey himself appears at the beginning and end of each episode.

Episodes
Episode One (4 November 1955)
Episode Two (11 November 1955)
Episode Three (18 November 1955)
Episode Four (25 November 1955)
Episode Five (2 December 1955)

The last two episodes are still missing from ITV's archive, but the other three remain intact, despite the age of the show (most shows from ITV's older rival, the BBC, from this era are lost and likely always will be).

Composite edition
The whole series was cut down for one 2 hour programme, and screened in the North of England on 23 December 1956 by ABC.

See also
Gert and Daisy - 1959 ITV sitcom

References

Mark Lewisohn, "Radio Times Guide to TV Comedy", BBC Worldwide Ltd, 2003
Love and Kisses at British TV Comedy

External links 
 

1955 British television series debuts
1955 British television series endings
1950s British sitcoms
Black-and-white British television shows
ITV sitcoms
Television shows produced by Associated-Rediffusion
English-language television shows